Hannay was a 1988 ITV television series, a prequel spin-off from the 1978 film version of John Buchan's 1915 novel The Thirty-Nine Steps. The film and series starred Robert Powell as Richard Hannay in the post Second Boer War years.

Plot 
In the series, Powell reprised the role of Hannay, an Edwardian mining engineer from Rhodesia of Scottish origin. It features his adventures in pre-World War I Britain. These stories had little in common with John Buchan's novels about the character, although some character names are taken from his other novels.

Principal Cast 
 Robert Powell as Richard Hannay
 Gavin Richards as Count Von Schwabing
 Christopher Scoular as Reggie Armitage
 Jill Meager as Eleanor Armitage

Episodes

Series One

Series Two

Production
There were two series, the first with six episodes, the second with seven. Though a mixture of studio and location filming, the entire production (with the exception of the opening and closing title footage) was shot on videotape rather than the more expensive (yet typical) practice of shooting TV drama location exteriors on 16mm film. This maintained a more consistent atmosphere and look to the episodes.

Home media availability 
Hannay was released in a four-disc Region 2 DVD set by Delta Visual Entertainment in February 2006.

Hannay was later released in a four-disc Region 2 DVD set by Network in September 2016.

References

External links 
 

1988 British television series debuts
1989 British television series endings
1980s British drama television series
British adventure television series
English-language television shows
Espionage television series
ITV television dramas
John Buchan
Television shows based on British novels
Television series by Fremantle (company)
Television shows produced by Thames Television
Television series set in the 1910s
Television series set in the 20th century
Detective television series
Live action television shows based on films